John Lishman Potter (1834–1931) was an English goldminer, stonemason and builder, who emigrated to New Zealand to work. He was born in Sunderland, England in 1834.

References

1834 births
1931 deaths
English stonemasons
New Zealand gold prospectors
People of the Otago Gold Rush
British emigrants to New Zealand